The Hindu Endowments Board (HEB) is a statutory board under the Ministry of Culture, Community and Youth (MCCY).

Role

Temple and Community Organization management
The Hindu Endowments Board (HEB) manages the Sri Mariamman Temple, Sri Srinivasa Perumal Temple, Sri Sivan Temple and Sri Vairavimada Kaliamman Temples, and also administers a half-way house, where substance abusers are rehabilitated.

Celebration of Hindu Festivals 
HEB’s involvement in community projects spans from free medical counseling services to bringing Deepavali joy to Little India, Singapore through a street light up and trade fair held annually during the festive season. Underprivileged Singaporeans in community homes and charities are not forgotten and benefit through Deepavali Cheer, HEB’s annual festive care and share programme.

HEB is responsible for organizing major Hindu festivals like Thaipusam and Firewalking. It also helps other Hindu temples in Singapore on staff matters, religious issues and getting land for relocation of temples. HEB actively supports and is involved in inter religious activities and community service projects organized by the various religious groups in Singapore.

History

Formation of the Hindu Endowments Board 
The Hindu Endowments Board (HEB) was formed in 1968 by an Act passed in parliament which transferred the management of 4 major Hindu temples from the Mohammedan and Hindu Endowments Board (MHEB). The MHEB was formed in 1907 by the British Empire's government of Colony of Singapore in early Singapore to overcome shortcomings in the management of Hindu and Muslim religious entities.

Formation of the Hindu Advisory Board  
In 1985, the Hindu Advisory Board (HAB) was established to advise the Government and HEB on matters of Hindu religion and customs. Both the Hindu Endowments Board and the Hindu Advisory Board are headed by Chairpersons appointed by the Ministry of Community Development, Youth and Sports. There are presently 16 members in HEB and 12 members in HAB.

See also
 List of Hindu temples in Singapore
 List of Indian organisations in Singapore

References

1968 establishments in Singapore
Indian diaspora in Singapore
Hinduism in Singapore
Statutory boards of the Singapore Government